Hypselodoris flavomarginata is a species of sea slug or dorid nudibranch, a marine gastropod mollusk in the family Chromodorididae.

Distribution
This nudibranch is known only from New Caledonia in the southern Pacific Ocean.

Description
Hypselodoris flavomarginata has a pink body and a wide light-yellow mantle edge. A thinner white line separates the yellow mantle from the pink body and dorsum. The gills and rhinophores are white and dark-pink. This species can reach a total length of at least 25 mm and feeds on sponges.

References

Chromodorididae
Gastropods described in 1995